Tomislav Dančulović (born 15 June 1980 in Rijeka) is a Croatian cyclist.

Palmares

2003
2nd National Trime Trial Championships
2004
1st  National Road Race Championships
3rd Overall Paths of King Nikola
3rd GP Triberg-Schwarzwald
2006
1st Overall Rhône-Alpes Isère Tour
2007
1st  National Road Race Championships
1st Gran Premio Città di Felino
1st Gara Ciclistica Montappone
2008
1st  National Road Race Championships
2009
1st Trofeo Zsšdi
2011
1st Raiffeisen Grand Prix
2nd Overall Okolo Slovenska
2nd National Road Race Championships

References

1980 births
Living people
Croatian male cyclists